Sheikh Abdullah bin Zayed bin Sultan Al Nahyan (born 30 April 1972) is the Minister of Foreign Affairs and International Cooperation of the United Arab Emirates. He is a son of the founder of the United Arab Emirates, Zayed bin Sultan Al Nahyan. In 2020, he was a signatory of the Abraham Accords on behalf of the UAE.

Personal life
Abdullah bin Zayed was born in Abu Dhabi on 30 April 1972. He holds a degree in political science from UAE University. He is married to Sheikha Alyazia bint Saif Al Nahyan, who became an FAO Goodwill Ambassador extraordinary in 2010, and has five children: Fatima, Mohammad, Zayed, Saif and Theyab.

Career

Sheikh Abdullah bin Zayed Al Nahyan was appointed Minister of Foreign Affairs and International Cooperation of the United Arab Emirates on 9 February 2006.

In 2017, leaked emails highlighted that Abdullah bin Zayed maintained close contacts with Tony Blair, who was being funded by the UAE as the Middle East peace envoy. Blair held a number of official meetings with the UAE Foreign Minister. The emails also revealed that Abdullah bin Zayed was one of the UAE royals who bankrolled the envoy. In 2011, Sheikh Abdullah's office separately sent $2 million to Blair through Windrush Ventures, which channeled money for Tony Blair's commercial advisory work. The UAE Foreign Ministry also transferred $12 million to Windrush for Blair consultancy work in Colombia, Vietnam and Mongolia.

In August 2017, Sheikh Abdullah urged Iran and Turkey to end what the UAE called their "colonial" actions in Syria, signaling unease about diminishing Gulf Arab influence in the war, and calling "the exit of those parties trying to reduce the sovereignty of the Syrian state." He added that "if Iran and Turkey continue the same historical, colonial and competitive behavior and perspectives between them in Arab affairs, we will continue in this situation not just in Syria today but tomorrow in some other country."

On 14 February 2019, Sheikh Abdullah said that Israel was justified in attacking Iranian targets in Syria.

On 15 September 2020, Sheikh Abdullah signed the official Israel–United Arab Emirates peace agreement in a ceremony at the White House in Washington, D.C., US.

In February 2022, the UAE abstained in a UN Security Council vote to condemn Russia for invading Ukraine. Sheikh Abdullah had a call with US Secretary of State Antony Blinken prior to the UN Security Council vote. In the phone call, Blinken spoke of the "importance of building a strong international response to support Ukrainian sovereignty through the UN Security Council." The Emirati readout of the phone call did not include Blinken's statement.

Other roles 
Sheikh Abdullah bin Zayed is a member of the UAE's National Security Council, Deputy Chairman of the UAE's Permanent Committee on Borders, Chairman of the National Media Council, chairman of the Board of Directors of the Emirates Foundation for Youth Development, Deputy Chairman of the Board of Directors of the Abu Dhabi Fund for Development (ADFD) and Board Member of the National Defense College.

Sheikh Abdullah bin Zayed served as Minister of Information and Culture from 1997 to 2006. Previously, he served as Chairman of Emirates Media Incorporated, Chairman of the UAE Football Association (1993–2001), and as the Under Secretary of the Ministry of Information and Culture from 1995 to 1997.

Honours 
 : Order of Skanderbeg (decorated by President of Albania Bujar Nishani on 13 March 2016).
 : Honorary Knight Commander of the Order of St Michael and St George.

Ancestry

See also

List of foreign ministers in 2017
List of current foreign ministers

References

External links

Abdullah bin Zayed
Children of presidents of the United Arab Emirates
Emirati politicians
Foreign ministers of the United Arab Emirates
Culture ministers of the United Arab Emirates
United Arab Emirates University alumni
1972 births
Living people
Recipients of the Order of Skanderbeg (1990–)
Honorary Knights Commander of the Order of St Michael and St George
Sons of monarchs